Azeem Daultana  (Punjabi, }; 4 April 1979 – 10 January 2012) was a Pakistani politician from the Pakistan Peoples Party who served as a member of the National Assembly of Pakistan and parliamentary secretary for information. Daultana also served as the federal parliamentary secretary for defence.

Daultana died in a road accident near the town of Vehari in January 2012. He was a nephew of prominent politician Tehmina Daultana and also related to Mian Mumtaz Daultana. He died a few days before he was scheduled to be married.

References

1979 births
2012 deaths
Pakistan People's Party politicians
Politicians from Punjab, Pakistan
People from Vehari District
Azeem
Road incident deaths in Pakistan